Bellingham Bay and British Columbia Railroad was built in the northwestern part of Washington, between the town of Whatcom, now Bellingham, then to the town of Sumas, to connect with the Canadian Pacific Railway for a continental connection.

History

The company was incorporated in California on June 21, 1883.  After the Northern Pacific Railroad chose Tacoma over Whatcom on Bellingham Bay, local railroad boosters along with Pierre B. Cornwall at their head started the B.B. and B.C. Railroad in 1883.

The company was capitalized for $10,000,000, with its aim to build a line from Bellingham (then known as Sehome) to Burrard Inlet now located in Vancouver, British Columbia, Canada, a distance of about 56 miles.

Construction began in 1884 with much activity, then soon slowed.  After reaching Whatcom Creek, it headed towards Sumas, Washington, to a connection, also being slowly built in Canada. At that time the Canadian Pacific Railway was working very hard over the Canadian Rockies and down the Fraser Valley.

By 1889, the line was still slowly pushing forward towards the Canada–United States border, while another road, the Fairhaven and Southern Railroad, was pushing south from Fairhaven towards Skagit County and planned a connection with the northbound Northern Pacific Railroad.

But construction soon continued and the road was graded further north with materials en route by ship, and reached the Canada–US border in 1891 and several weeks later the Canadian Pacific Railway reached the border.

More lines were completed and by 1902, lines to Glacier, Washington and Lynden Washington had been built as were other short lines to numerous logging camps. Signs of these old roads can be found throughout the county. Another spur headed east of the former township of Goshen, Washington, crossed the Nooksack River just east of the Mt. Baker highway then crossed the Northern Pacific Railway tracks, through the town of Deming, Washington and ended near the township of Welcome.

The B.B. and B.C. was taken over by the Chicago,  Milwaukee and Saint Paul Railway and renamed the Bellingham and Northern in 1912. With the beginning of WWI in 1918, the Chicago, Milwaukee and St. Paul Railway was required to drop the unique names of their many wholly owned subsidiaries and operate them under the parent company's name. The line was used to serve several industries along the line including a limestone mine in Kendall, Washington, a lumber mill in Strandell as well as a farm supply store and two Bellingham Cold Storage plants.

Burlington Northern Era, 1980-1996
The Milwaukee Road pulled out of the Pacific Northwest at the end of 1980 and sold the line to the Burlington Northern. By this point, limestone was being shipped to the cement plant by truck rather than rail. In response to this, the BN abandoned the line from Sumas to Limestone Junction with the track now connecting with the BN's Sumas Subdivision. The line between the wye at Hampton and the Orchard Street-based cold storage was abandoned after vandals burned down a trestle carrying the line over the Nooksack River in Everson. The track between the Milwaukee's railyard and the crossing at Squalicum Parkway was also abandoned with the line now diverging off from the BN's railyard. With the railroad now separated, both surviving ends became industrial spurs.

The Bellingham side of the line was referred to as the "Cement Spur." The Cement Spur continued to serve both Bellingham Cold Storage plants, Mt. Baker Products, and a feed store at the corner of Birchwood Avenue and Meridian Street.

The Sumas side of the line was referred to as the "Lynden Branch" due to the fact that the line now terminated in Lynden. The Sumas side of the Lynden Branch serves a feed mill, lumber and garbage reloads, and a shingle factory. On the Lynden side of the line, the BN served a local feed dealer, a cold storage, and a Darigold factory.

BNSF Era, 1996- Present
The Burlington Northern merged with the Atchison, Topeka, and Santa Fe Railway in 1996 making the newly formed BNSF the new owners of the Mine Lead and Lynden Branch. By this point the feed mill had abandoned rail service leaving the north cold storage as the only non waterfront industry still serviced by rail. The winter of 1996 was very harsh. Rising waters from the Squalicum ravine ran over the railroad tracks causing the tracks to wash out in several places. Not wanting to waste money on repairs, the BNSF abandoned the line beyond Mt. Baker Plywood.

In 1999, the Bellingham Cold Storage purchased the line beyond Mt. Baker Plywood renaming it the Bellingham International Railway. The Bellingham International served the north cold storage plant on an as needed basis with the BNSF backing reefers into their plant and pulling them out. Operations continued until 2004 when the line washed out once again. The Bellingham International Railroad was filed for abandonment in 2009 with crossings at Meridian Street and Birchwood Avenue being removed in 2010.

The Bellingham Railroad Museum leased the track from Orchard Street to its termination near James Street Road that same year. This marked the first time that a majority of the track had been used since 1980. The operations ran until the end of 2011 when the city of Bellingham purchased the track in order to turn it into a part of the "Bay-to-Baker" rail trail. The tracks were removed shortly after with the right of way now serving as a trail.

Bellingham Cold Storage ended their deal with the BNSF around this same time leaving Mt. Baker Products as the sole remaining customer on the Cement Spur. Mt. Baker Products receives rail service on an as needed basis with boxcars being pushed up to the switch for the mill's industrial lead. A railcar mover brings the boxcars in and out of the industrial lead. BNSF has not operated any locomotives beyond the lead's switch since the Bellingham International washed out due to poor track conditions. The plywood mill also maintains their industrial lead with private contractors doing maintenance.

The Lynden Branch currently serves five industries, four in Sumas and one in Lynden. The Sumas side includes EPL Feed, Mountain View Reload, Pacific Rim Reload, and IKO Pacific, Inc. EPL Feed is an elevator that ships out fertilizer and cotton seed. The Mountain View reload ships out lumber. The Pacific Rim Reload takes in garbage containers from Rabanco who ships them off on trucks. IKO Pacific produces shingles and requires tar to produce them with some roofing supplies being shipped by rail.

At the start of the 21st Century, Darigold, Martin's Feed and AmeriCold were the three remaining industries beyond Sumas, all in Lynden. DariGold ended their service with the BNSF sometime in the 2000s. Martin's Feed announced intentions to move to Sumas in May 2017 and began construction on the new Sumas facility soon after. The Lynden-based facility closed in 2018 with rail service being moved to Sumas. AmeriCold continued to receive service until September 2019 when they terminated their contract with the BNSF. The last train to Lynden was on September 10, 2019 when the final reefer was picked up from AmeriCold with the line beyond Sumas becoming dormant not too long after.

The line beyond Halverstick Road is currently dormant with the line beyond Halverstick Road in use as an overload/storage track to store unneeded railcars. The BNSF stored autoracks and centerbeams on the line between Hampton and Lynden that couldn't be used due to the COVID-19 pandemic. These railcars were removed from the line a few months later.

Remains
Today, several remains of the former track are still in place. In Bellingham, the Bellingham Cold Storage's waterfront based facilities' tracks are still in place, however only one of the two leads is still used. The second lead was last used in the early to mid 2010's to store an out of service shoving platform. Beyond Mt. Baker Products, the railroad crossing at Roeder Avenue is still intact with the rails going through the road and a crossbuck still standing guard. Most of the old Bellingham International is still in place up to just past the Northwest Avenue overpass including the washout that supposedly caused the BNSF to abandon the track. Portions of the line have been removed at this point in preparation of the "Bay-to-Baker Trail." An "End of Maintained Track" sign can be seen at this point implying that the BNSF had no plans to maintain the line beyond this point should it have still been in service.

The track remains intact beyond the trailhead including a trestle that carried the line over Squalicum Creek. The line is cut at the Meridian Street and Birchwood Avenue crossings due to their removal in 2010. Traces of the feed store's old industrial lead can still be made out even though the track was torn out long ago. The foot of industrial lead to the Orchard Street Bellingham Cold Storage still exists, but the switchstand was recently removed. The industrial lead's right of way is fenced off beyond the Orchard Street crossing with "Tracks out of Service" signs being installed at the former railroad crossing.

Between this point and the former wye at Hampton, there are no longer any tracks still intact. Parts of the former right of way are currently being used as private roads and driveways. Places where the track once was is still clearly visible with clearings in between trees and foliage. Two trestles still exist: one in Bellingham just past the former crossing at Hannegan Road and one just past Dewey Road on the outskirts of Bellingham. A short portion of the right of way is now being used as a road fittingly named "Milwaukee Road." Google Maps still shows track symbols for a small portion of the former line around Roberts Road even though the tracks beyond James Street were pulled out in the 1990s.

In Everson, parts of the right of way have been turned into trails. Everson Road has been relocated to where the tracks once crossed at the Nooksack River. Up towards Hampton, the right of way is clearly visible. Tracks from the north leg of the wye going to Lynden up to Hampton Road are still in place to this day along with a small section of the south leg of the wye with switches still in place.

In Sumas, the former mainline into Canada is still in use as the industrial lead for the Pacific Rim Reload with the line cutting off after a trestle near Kneuman Road. The right of way beyond Victoria Court has been turned into a private dirt road that is used by the border patrol. The track on the Canadian side is still in use as yard tracks. The Burlington Northern's former connection track is still in place and used as a "house track" to store the local switching power.

The extension to Glacier is still in service up to the Sumas Subdivision where it curves and connects to the line. This is how the present day Lynden Branch is accessed. Beyond Sumas there are no tracks remaining in place with the exception of a small piece of track beyond Maple Falls used to store a caboose at the Glacier Guest Suites. Several trestles that carried the line over Saar Creek are still in place with several being restored for usage as part of the trails of a Christian retreat. Other surviving trestles are on private property. Much of the old right of way can still be seen with the trackbed for the line between South Pass Road and the former wye at Limestone Junction still being in place. Marks where rails once were below the ore loader in the abandoned limestone mine can be seen. Most of the right of way is easy to spot as it parallels telephone poles. The old depot in Glacier has been restored and can be rented to sleep in.

Conversion to rail trail 

The decommissioned rail bed of the B.B. and B.C. is planned to be converted into a rail trail as parts of the Nooksack Loop Trail and the Bay to Baker Trail. Parts of these trails have already been constructed (in particular within the city limits of Bellingham and Everson), but most of the trail is still in the planning stages.

See also
 List of Washington railroads

References
http://nwownrailfan.com/archives/features/0203currier1.html

Sources

External links
 http://www.barlowgenealogy.com/FairfieldFamilies/PBCorn.html
 http://nwownrailfan.com/archives/features/0203currier1.html
 http://www.historylink.org/index.cfm?DisplayPage=output.cfm&file_id=7327 History of Whatcom County, volume 1, Lottie Roeder Roth, 1926

Defunct Washington (state) railroads